The Agencia Boliviana de Correos is a state-owned corporation serving as Bolivia's national postal service since 1 March 2018. It replaces the Empresa de Correos de Bolivia, which was dissolved and liquidated following financial difficulties.

References

External links 

 Official website

Communications in Bolivia
Philately of Bolivia
Bolivia
2018 establishments in Bolivia